András Gálfi (born January 15, 1973) is a Hungarian middleweight boxer. He is a former Hungarian, WBC International and WBO Inter-Continental middleweight champion.

External links 

1973 births
Living people
Martial artists from Budapest
Hungarian male boxers
Middleweight boxers